Antipruritics, abirritants, or anti-itch drugs, are medications that inhibit the itching (Latin: pruritus) often associated with sunburns, allergic reactions, eczema, psoriasis, chickenpox, fungal infections, insect bites and stings like those from mosquitoes, fleas, and mites, and contact dermatitis and urticaria caused by plants such as poison ivy (urushiol-induced contact dermatitis) or stinging nettle. It can also be caused by chronic kidney disease and related conditions.

Abirritants consist of a large group of drugs belonging to different classes with varying mechanisms to treat itch. They may work either directly or indirectly to relieve itch, and evidence on their effectiveness varies from one class to another. Some alternative medicines are also used to treat itch. Side effects of abirritants also vary depending on the class of the drug. Even before the emergence of modern evidence-based medicine, abirritants have already been used in many civilizations, but practices and choice of drugs may differ by culture.

Types 
A number of drug classes are available as abirritants for itching relief, but there is no one single specific abirritant to treat all forms of itch. Treatments may vary depending on the cause. Commonly prescribed abirritants can be broadly divided into topical and systemic drugs, and may include a combination of one or more drugs, described as below.

Topical

Topical formulations are preferred for treating localized itch caused by skin damage, inflammation or dryness. Topical antipruritics in the form of creams and sprays are often available over the counter. The active ingredients usually belong to these classes:
 Antihistamines such as diphenhydramine (Benadryl) and hydroxyzine
 Corticosteroids such as hydrocortisone topical cream, see topical steroid
 Counterirritants, such as mint oil, menthol, or camphor
 Local anesthetics such as lidocaine, pramoxine, or benzocaine in topical creams or lotions

Systemic drugs 

Generalized itch, or itching across the whole body, can be a symptom of a dermatological disorder or an underlying systemic problem. Some systemic diseases can that cause generalized itch include diabetes, hypothyroidism, kidney diseases and liver diseases. It is usually treated with systemic agents instead of topical agents. Corticosteroids and antihistamines mentioned above can also be used to treat generalized itch. Common systemic abirritants are listed below:

Oral antipruritics are usually prescription drugs. Those more recently described include:
 Nalfurafine, a centrally-acting κ-opioid receptor agonist approved for uremic pruritus and effective in animal models of other prurituses
 Oclacitinib, a janus kinase inhibitor used to control pruritus in dogs.

Substances proposed to act antipruritically, but not used medically
 Burow's solution, an astringent aqueous solution of  aluminium triacetate, is shown to soothe and to relieve itching.
 Olive oil
 Jewelweed has been shown to be devoid of any anti-itch activity in several controlled studies.
 Calamine lotion, containing zinc oxide and iron(III) oxide, is a traditional remedy for mild itching, such as that typically associated with chicken pox – although the U.S. Food and Drug Administration has asserted that it has little if any scientific evidence. Nevertheless, they subsequently recommended applying topical OTC skin protectants, such as calamine, to relieve the itch caused by poisonous plants such as poison ivy, poison oak, and poison sumac.
 Paste of sodium bicarbonate (baking soda) and water, applied topically
 Ammonium hydroxide (household ammonia), applied topically
 Papain-based topical creams.

Alternative treatments 
A number of herbs have been used to treat itching such as cannabis, pigweed (portulaca oleracaea), Ashoka (sarco asoca), and fig (fificus carica).

Other unconventional forms of treatment with potential efficacy for treating systemic itch include topical cannabinoids and H4 antihistamines.

Effectiveness 
Despite the availability of many forms of treatment, there is only a limited number of case series or small-scale studies examining the efficacy of abirritants. There is a lack of evidence on treatment for chronic pruritus of unknown origin. There is also little to no evidence on the efficacy and safety of using abirritants during pregnancy.

Treating itch associated with disease 
Some abirritants work by indirectly treating itch through treating the causative medical conditions, which means that the itching associated with the condition will often subside when it is properly treated. This includes antihistamines and corticosteroids, which are effective in treating inflammatory disorders of the skin, in particular atopic dermatitis. Successful treatment of atopic dermatitis with either corticosteroids or antihistamines would resolve the associated itching.

Treating itch directly 
Some abirritants treat pruritus directly without necessarily treating the causative medical condition. Abirritants that directly treat itching and are established to be effective are reported here in the table below:

Traditional Chinese Medicine 

Traditional Chinese medicine is extensively used in Asia for relief of itch. It is believed that itching is caused by irritations from wind, dampness or blood stasis, and can be relieved by the use of herbs such as chrysanthemum, gardenia fruit or mung bean. Sometimes these herbal remedies are used in combination with acupuncture and moxibustion, but their efficacy is still unclear. Sericin cream and oral omega-3 fatty acid supplements may show benefit in reducing itch.

Adverse effects 
Each class of abirritants has its own set of potential adverse effects.

Systemic Corticosteroids 

Systemic corticosteroid use has been associated with a wide range of potential adverse effects. In a review article, the following common complications were noted for prolonged use: redistribution of fat tissues (moon face), high blood sugar, infections, delayed wound healing, and HPA axis suppression, where the body's natural production of hormones like corticotropin-releasing hormone and adrenocorticotropic hormone is suppressed as a response to the increased level of corticosteroids in the blood.

There is a lack of data on adverse effects associated with corticosteroid use of a shorter period and lower dose.

Topical Corticosteroids 
Both local and systemic side effects can result from topical corticosteroid use, especially in prolonged treatment.

Local side effects can occur regularly from prolonged use, which include skin atrophy (thinning), stretch marks, infections, lighter skin color, and sudden decrease in efficacy of the drug.

Systemic side effects are far less prevalent than local ones. Prolonged high potency corticosteroids use on thin skin, especially in children, increases the risk of systemic side effects since thin skin allows for greater absorption. One commonly cited systemic side effect from topical use is HPA axis suppression. A meta-analysis of topical corticosteroid use in children concluded that low-potency corticosteroid at recommended dosages and duration do not cause clinically significant HPA suppression.

Antihistamines 
Antihistamines target the molecule histamine by blocking the histamine H1 receptor. First-generation antihistamines like diphenhydramine and chlorpheniramine are able to move from the blood into the brain across the blood–brain barrier, where they block the H1 receptor, reducing the neurotransmitter effect of histamine, leading to central nervous system side effects such as drowsiness and confusion. Second generation antihistamines, such as fexofenadine and cetirizine are less able to move from blood circulation into the brain and are therefore associated with fewer side effects in usual doses.

μ-opioid receptor antagonists 
μ-opioid receptor antagonists are usually well-tolerated and have no abuse potential since they do not cause physical dependence. Side effects are dose-dependent and generally limited to the first two weeks of treatment. Opioid withdrawal symptoms are rare and may include severe lightheadedness, depersonalization and anxiety.

Antidepressants 
Serotonin reuptake inhibitors, including both serotonin-norepinephrine reuptake inhibitors (SNRIs) and selective serotonin reuptake inhibitors (SSRIs), are generally well tolerated. Common side effects include:
 Sexual dysfunction, which is the most common side effect of all serotonin reuptake inhibitors, manifesting as delayed ejaculation, inability to achieve orgasm and decreased libido.
 Gastrointestinal effects such as nausea and vomiting, which depend on the dose and usually resolve within the first two weeks of treatment.
 Central nervous system disturbances such as anxiety, insomnia and sedation.
 Suicide risk: a combined analysis of placebo-controlled trials of various antidepressants including SSRIs in children and adolescents showed a doubled risk of suicide in those taking antidepressants. In response, the United States Food and Drug Administration issued a warning in 2004 regarding the elevated risk of suicidal thoughts and behavior in children and adolescents.

Immunosuppressants 
Immunosuppressants may cause immunodeficiency, resulting in an increased susceptibility to infection. Other side effects include bone marrow suppression, increased risk of cardiovascular disease and increased risk of cancer.

Capsaicin 
Being the main chemical that causes heat in chili pepper, the main side effect of capsaicin is a burning sensation that usually persists for several days. A topical anaesthetic can be used to reduce the sensation. In addition, the topical anaesthetic can also provide anti-itch effect on its own.

History 

Abirritants have an extensive history in treating itch. The history of abirritants dates back to the Byzantine period, when Alexander of Tralleis, a famous physician, recommended crushed rue and alum mixed in honey for topical application to the scalp for itching caused by scabby conditions of the head.

During the 7th century, Paul of Aegina, a famous Greek physician, described a list of drugs for treatment of itch including plants such as the squill, metallic components, and goat droppings which were applied externally. These drugs are common in ancient pharmacopeia.

The Lorscher Azneibuch written in the monastery of Lorsch in the 7th century described many preparations of abirritants for both systemic and topical use, such as an ointment prepared from stinging nettle seeds.

Mercury-coated girdles were used in the 17th century as an expensive treatment to alleviate symptoms of itch caused by scabies, but mercury toxins in the blood often caused other troubling symptoms in patients.

In the 20th century, many new abirritants for external use emerged, including salicylic acids, naphthol, tar, carbolic acid, thymol, and menthol, which were mostly available in the form of ointments. Alcohol and opium were also commonly prescribed.

See also 
 Itching
 Atopic dermatitis

References

External links 
 

Antipruritics